Buxton Birbick Smith  was Dean of Ontario from 1891 to 1906.

Smith was educated at Bishop's University, Lennoxville. Ordained a deacon in 1869 and a priest in 1871 he was a missionary at Onslow, Nova Scotia until 1878. He then served at Marysburg, Shannonville, Ottawa and Sherbrooke before his appointment as Dean.

References

Bishop's University alumni
Deans of Ontario
19th-century Canadian Anglican priests
20th-century Canadian Anglican priests